The Southeast Upsalquitch River is an eastern tributary of the Upsalquitch River in the northwest of New Brunswick, Canada, flowing through Northumberland County and Balmoral Parish and Addington Parish in Restigouche County.

In its course towards the northwest, the Southeast Upsalquitch River runs through the Naturalists Mountains and passes to the northeast of Caribou Mountain.

Geography 

The Southeast Upsalquitch River originates at the mouth of Upsalquitch Lake, in the Northumberland County. This lake is located in a small north-south valley that extends to the south on the other hydrographic side to Popple Depot, located on the north bank of the Nepisiguit River. Upsalquitch Lake is embedded in the Naturalists Mountains.

The mouth of Lake Upsalquitch is located in a forested area:
  to the west of the summit of Mount Perley (Northumberland County)
  to the northwest of the summit of Mount Chamberlain (Northumberland County)
  to the northeast of the summit of Mount Hay (Northumberland County)
  to the south of the southern boundary of Balmoral Parish (Restigouche County)
  to the southwest of the confluence of the Little Southeast Upsalquitch River
  to the southwest of the confluence of the Upsalquitch River

From the outlet of Lake Upsalquitch, the Southeast Upsalquitch River flows  in a little valley surrounded by high mountains, in the following segments:

Upper course of the river (segment of )
  northward, up to the border of Balmoral Parish
  northeastward to Cook Savoie Gulch (from the east)
  northwestward in Balmoral Parish to Eighteen Mile Brook
  northwestward to Murray Brook (from the northeast)
  westward to Ramsay Brook (from the southwest)
  northward to McCormack Brook (from the west)
  northward to Meadow Brook (from the east)

Lower course of the river (segment of )
  northwestward to Mulligan Brook (from the southwest)
  northward to the Little Southeast Upsalquitch River (from the northeast)
  northwestward to Ferguson Brook (from the Southwest)
  westward, crossing the Southeast Lower Falls and passing north of Caribou Mountain, to its confluence with the Upsalquitch River

The Southeast Upsalquitch River empties into a river curve on the east bank of the Upsalquitch River.

Climate 
Upsalquitch Lake has a subarctic climate (Dfc). Summers are typically rainy and mild with only a handful of warm days and cool nighttime temperatures. Winters are some of the longest, coldest and snowiest in New Brunswick, with annual snowfall averaging 130 inches (330 cm). Winters can begin towards the end of October and last well into April.

See also 

 
 List of rivers of New Brunswick
 Chaleur Bay
 Gulf of Saint Lawrence
 Restigouche River
 Northumberland County, county of New Brunswick

References

External links 
 Website: Restigouche.org - Watershed Management Council of the Restigouche River Inc. - Conseil de Gestion du Bassin Versant de la Rivière Restigouche inc
 Southeast / Trekking - Quebec - Report of a boating expedition on the Upsalquitch

Rivers of New Brunswick
Geography of Restigouche County, New Brunswick
Mi'kmaq in Canada
Canadian Heritage Rivers